Matthew White Ridley, 4th Viscount Ridley  (29 July 1925 – 22 March 2012), was a British nobleman. He notably served as Lord Steward of the Household from 1989 to 2001.

Background, education and military service
Ridley was the son of Matthew White Ridley, 3rd Viscount Ridley, and Ursula Lutyens, daughter of Sir Edwin Lutyens. His younger brother Nicholas Ridley, Baron Ridley of Liddesdale, was a prominent Conservative Party politician who served as a government minister for nearly all of Margaret Thatcher's years as Prime Minister.

Matthew Ridley was educated at Eton College and spent several months studying agriculture at King's College, University of Durham (now Newcastle University). The Second World War interrupted his education and he joined the Coldstream Guards, serving in Normandy and Germany in 1944–45. He then studied at Oxford, graduating with a degree in Agriculture from Balliol College in 1948.

He then served as an aide-de-camp to Sir Evelyn Baring, then Governor of Kenya. During this time he furthered his interest in nature and science. In 1955, Ridley and zoologist Lord Richard Percy spent four months on an uninhabited island in the Seychelles studying the plight of the dwindling sooty tern.

Later he joined the Territorial Army, reaching the rank of Brevet Colonel in the Northumberland Hussars: he became Honorary Colonel of that unit in 1979.

Public life
Ridley succeeded his father in the viscountcy in 1964. He was Chairman of Northumberland County Council from 1967 to 1979. He chaired several companies and societies, before serving as Chancellor of the University of Newcastle from 1988 to 1999, as Lord Lieutenant of Northumberland from 1984 to 2000, and as Lord Steward of the Household from 1989 to 2001. He was succeeded by the Duke of Abercorn as Lord Steward in 2001.

He was made a Knight Companion of the Order of the Garter in 1992 and appointed a Knight Grand Cross of the Royal Victorian Order in 1994. He retired in 1999 and did not stand for election as a hereditary peer after the House of Lords Act.

Marriage and children
Ridley was married on 3 January 1953 to Lady Anne Katharine Gabrielle Lumley (born 16 November 1928, died 2006), daughter of Lawrence Lumley, 11th Earl of Scarbrough. They had four children together:

 Hon. Cecilia Anne Ridley (born 1 December 1953)
 Hon. Rose Emily Ridley (13 August 1956 – 24 June 2020), married Owen Paterson in 1980 and had two sons and a daughter
 Matthew White Ridley, 5th Viscount Ridley (born 7 February 1958)
 Hon. Mary Victoria Ridley (born 30 November 1962)

Ridley died on 22 March 2012 and was succeeded in the viscountcy by his only son.

References

External links

1925 births
2012 deaths
Military personnel from Northumberland
Knights of the Garter
Knights Grand Cross of the Royal Victorian Order
Lord-Lieutenants of Northumberland
Alumni of Balliol College, Oxford
British Army personnel of World War II
Coldstream Guards officers
People associated with Newcastle University
Viscounts in the Peerage of the United Kingdom
Northumberland Hussars officers
Matthew
Lutyens family
People educated at Eton College
Ridley